Radical skepticism (or radical scepticism in British English) is the philosophical position that knowledge is most likely impossible. Radical skeptics hold that doubt exists as to the veracity of every belief and that certainty is therefore never justified. To determine the extent to which it is possible to respond to radical skeptical challenges is the task of epistemology or "the theory of knowledge".

See also
Pyrrhonism
Cratylism
Epistemological nihilism
Nihilism
Skepticism

References

Leavitt, Fred (2021) If Ignorance is Bliss We Should All be Ecstatic. Open Books

Notes
The Epistemology Page

Skepticism